Campylorhaphion flexum is a species of sea snail, a marine gastropod mollusk in the family Eulimidae. The species is one of a number within the genus Eulima.

References

External links
 Adams, A. (1861). On some new species of Eulima, Leiostraca and Cerithiopsis from Japan. Annals and Magazine of Natural History. (3) 7: 125-131
 Bouchet, P. & Warén, A. (1986). Revision of the Northeast Atlantic bathyal and abyssal Aclididae Eulimidae, Epitonidae (Mollusca, Gastropoda). Bollettino Malacologico. suppl. 2: 297-576

Gastropods described in 1861